Charles Lane Aston (1875 – 9 January 1931) was an English association footballer.

Career

Born in Bilston, Staffordshire, Aston started his career at local club Bilston United. He joined Walsall as a professional in December 1895, getting his first experience of playing in the Football League before joining First Division side Aston Villa in 1898. During his first full season at the club, Aston played 13 games as Villa won the league. Villa retained their title in 1899–1900.

Aston left Villa in 1901. After one-season spells at Queens Park Rangers, Burton United, Gresley Rovers and Burton United again, Aston joined Watford in 1905. He played 51 games as Watford won the United League but finished 14th in the Southern League. The following season, Watford improved to finish 9th in the Southern League, and Aston scored his only goal for the club in a 2–0 win over Portsmouth on 22 September 1906 at Cassio Road. After playing in all 41 of Watford's fixtures in 1907–08, Aston left to club to join Leyton, with whom he finished his career. He died in Leytonstone on 9 January 1931.

Honours

Aston Villa
Football League First Division:
1898–99, 1899–1900

Watford
United League:
1905–06

Notes

References

1875 births
1931 deaths
People from Bilston
Association football defenders
English Football League players
Southern Football League players
Walsall F.C. players
Aston Villa F.C. players
Queens Park Rangers F.C. players
Burton United F.C. players
Gresley F.C. players
Watford F.C. players
Leyton F.C. players
English footballers